Zymrina is a monotypic moth genus in the family Oecophoridae erected by John Frederick Gates Clarke in 1978. Its only species, Zymrina xanthosema, was first described by Edward Meyrick in 1931. It is found in Chile.

References

Moths described in 1931
Oecophorinae
Monotypic moth genera
Moths of South America
Endemic fauna of Chile